Francesco Barberini, iuniore (12 November 1662 – 17 August 1738) was an Italian Cardinal of the family of Pope Urban VIII (1623–1644) and of the Princes of Palestrina.

Biography
He was born in Rome,  the eldest son of Maffeo Barberini and Olimpia Giustiniani (a niece of Pope Innocent X), the nephew of cardinal Carlo Barberini and the grandson of Taddeo Barberini (a nephew of Pope Urban VIII). He gave up his birthright (as eldest son) for an ecclesiastic career thereby making his brother, Urbano Barberini, heir to the Barberini estate. 

He was created by Pope Alexander VIII on 13 November 1690 with the dispensation of having a cousin (Rinaldo d'Este, who later left his ecclesiastic career to marry) and uncle (Carlo Barberini) in the Sacred College and for not having yet received the minor orders. 

He was ordained deacon only in 1700 and priest in 1715. He participated in the five papal conclaves (1691, 1700, 1721, 1724 and 1730). Abbot of Farfa and Subiaco from 1704. On 3 Mar 1721, he was named Cardinal-Bishop of Palestrina and on 16 Mar 1721, he was consecrated bishop by Fabrizio Paolucci, Cardinal-Bishop of Albano, with Vincenzo Petra, Titular Archbishop of Damascus, and Bernardo Maria Conti, Bishop Emeritus of Terracina, Priverno e Sezze, serving as co-consecrators. On 1 July 1726 he was appointed Cardinal-Bishop of Ostia e Velletri. He became dean of the Sacred College of Cardinals in December 1734. 

He died at his Roman palace, at the age of 75.

References

1662 births
1738 deaths
Clergy from Rome
Francesco 3
17th-century Italian cardinals
Deans of the College of Cardinals
Cardinal-bishops of Ostia
Cardinal-bishops of Palestrina
Cardinals created by Pope Alexander VIII
18th-century Italian cardinals